Khandker Anwarul Islam is a retired Bangladeshi civil servant. He had served as the country's 22nd Cabinet Secretary. Prior to that, he was the Senior Secretary of the Bridges Division under Ministry of Road Transport and Bridges and the ex-officio Executive Director of Bangladesh Bridge Authority before joining at cabinet secretary post on 28 October 2019.

Career
Islam joined Bangladesh Civil Service in 1983 as an Upazila Magistrate under administration cadre after graduating with a Bachelor's and master's degree in Social Welfare from Dhaka University. At the beginning of his career, he served as upazila nirbahi officer (UNO), additional deputy commissioner and director in National Sports Council. After that he served as senior assistant secretary and Deputy Secretary in Parliament Secretariat, as Director in the Department of Relief and Rehabilitation under Ministry of Disaster Management and Relief and as Secretary in National Sports Council.

Islam also served as Joint Secretary and Additional Secretary in the Cabinet Division prior to his joining in the Bridges Division. He joined Bridges Division as Secretary in-charge on 13 November 2011, promoted to Secretary on 31 January 2013 and Senior Secretary on 13 July 2017. He has been appointed as the cabinet secretary on 28 October 2019 and retired on 15 December, 2022.

Personal life
Islam is married to Begum Kamrun Nahar, secretary to the Ministry of Information (Bangladesh). The couple have two sons.

References 

Living people
Bangladeshi civil servants
Year of birth missing (living people)
Secretaries of the Cabinet (Bangladesh)